Vriesea scalaris is a plant species in the genus Vriesea. This species is native to Brazil and Venezuela.

Cultivars
 Vriesea 'April's Fire'
 Vriesea 'Retroflexa'
 Vriesea 'Weyringeriana'

References

BSI Cultivar Registry Retrieved 11 October 2009

scalaris
Flora of Brazil
Flora of Venezuela